Hoplias malabaricus, also known as the wolf fish, tiger fish, guabine or trahira, is a predatory Central and South American freshwater ray-finned fish of the characiform family Erythrinidae.

Description

Like other members of the genus Hoplias this species has a cylindrical body shape with a large mouth equipped with prominent teeth.  The dog-like teeth have given it some of its common names.  Coloration is highly variable but is usually grey-brown with darker vertical stripes or a single horizontal stripe.

Distribution
Southern Central America to Argentina. Found in most river systems and in the following countries; Argentina, Bolivia, Brazil, Colombia, Costa Rica, Ecuador, French Guiana, Guyana, Paraguay, Peru, Suriname, Trinidad and Tobago, Uruguay and Venezuela.

Biology
Occurs in a wide range of freshwater habitats from clear, fast flowing, upland streams, to the slow turbid lowland waters, canals, irrigation and drainage ditches, and ponds and other still waters. Spends the daylight hours resting in vegetation and is most active during the night. Adults are ambush predators of fish (such as guppies), crustaceans (such as shrimp and crayfish) and mussels; while juveniles prey consists of crustacean and other invertebrate prey. This species spawns in pits located in shallow water and the males guard the nests even after the eggs have hatched.

Invasive species
Hoplias malabaricus are popular in the aquarium trade but are prohibited from being kept in California as a potentially invasive species. H. malabaricus was formerly established in Hillsborough County, Florida from either deliberate releases or fish farm escapes. Since January 1977 no specimens have been collected or reported; presumably the species was extirpated as result of extremely cold temperatures during that month.

Gallery

References

Fish of South America
Erythrinidae
Taxa named by Marcus Elieser Bloch
Fish described in 1794